Fairfield Township is one of thirteen townships in Franklin County, Indiana. As of the 2010 census, its population was 537.

Geography

History
Fairfield Township was established in 1821. Fairfield is a descriptive name referring to the beauty of the countryside.

The Old Franklin United Brethren Church was listed on the National Register of Historic Places in 1995.

Unincorporated towns
 Fairfield
The original town was founded in 1815. It was incorporated as a town in 1876. The village, on the East Fork of the Whitewater River, was known for its buggy-making operations in the late 1800s.

Notable natives included author James Maurice Thompson, who wrote "Alice of Old Vincennes." Women's suffrage pioneer Ida Husted Harper was born in Fairfield.

The town was inundated by a federal reservoir project in the late 1960s. 
 New Fairfield
New Fairfield was founded in the early 1970s after construction began on a federal reservoir project in the valley of the East Fork of the Whitewater River.

The town exists on land once owned by Carl Huber and Herschel Klein.

It contains no commerce or government agencies.

(This list is based on USGS data and may include former settlements.)

Adjacent townships
 Harmony Township, Union County (north)
 Union Township, Union County (northeast)
 Bath Township (east)
 Brookville Township (south)
 Blooming Grove Township (west)

Major highways
 Indiana State Road 101

Education
Fairfield Township residents may obtain a free library card from the Franklin County Public Library District in Brookville.

Notable people
Samuel Sidney Harrell (1838-1903), member of the Franklin County bar, served as prosecuting attorney, clerk of the circuit court of his county, spent several years in the Indiana Legislature

References
 
 United States Census Bureau cartographic boundary files

External links
 Indiana Township Association
 United Township Association of Indiana

Townships in Franklin County, Indiana
Townships in Indiana